Sir Lancelot is a platform game published in 1984 by Melbourne House for the Amstrad CPC and ZX Spectrum home computers.

Gameplay

Sir Lancelot, controlled by the player, must explore the 24 rooms of the castle and collect all the objects (which come in many forms but glow to make them identifiable) in each room before making his way to the exit to the next. His task is made more difficult by the presence of various guardians (including animals and soldiers) who he must avoid in each room. He also has a time limit in which to complete each room. Control is very simple, with only three keys needed: left, right and jump. A joystick can also be used.

The ZX Spectrum version has the rooms visited progressively whilst the Amstrad CPC version allows the rooms to be completed in any order. The Amstrad version also has a high-score table which the Spectrum version lacks.

The ZX Spectrum was written to run on the 16K version of the ZX Spectrum at a time when 48K games were the norm. In order to run on the 16K machine several shortcuts were made: Sir Lancelot moved two pixels at a time giving a slightly choppy appearance to his movement, and the screens were more simplistic than other platform games released at the same time.

Reception

See also
Manic Miner

References

External links

Review of the game from CRASH magazine.

1984 video games
Amstrad CPC games
Video games based on Arthurian legend
Video games developed in the United Kingdom
ZX Spectrum games